The electoral district of Gippsland South (initially known as South Gippsland) is a Lower House electoral district of the Victorian Parliament. It is located within the Eastern Victoria Region of the Legislative Council.

Gippsland South extends along the state's coast from Venus Bay to Loch Sport and includes the country Victorian towns of Foster, Korumburra, Leongatha, Mirboo North, Port Albert, Port Welshpool, Rosedale, Sale and Yarram. The electorate includes all of South Gippsland Shire and the southern parts of Wellington Shire. Industries include agriculture, timber production and tourism. Dairying is the biggest agricultural contributor to the local economy. Natural features include Wilsons Promontory National Park, Corner Inlet, and a number of lakes and islands along the coast and border.

Its area was initially defined by the 1858 Electoral Act as: "Commencing at the mouth of Merryman's Creek on the Ninety Mile Beach; bounded on the north by Merryman's Creek to where the road from Tarraville to Rosedale crosses said creek near Bayless's pre-emptive right, thence by a line west fourteen degrees to Buneep; on the west by the counties of Evelyn and Mornington to Cape Patterson; and on the south and south-east by the sea-coast to the commencing point"

The Electoral Act Amendment Act of 1888 created new districts of Gippsland Central,
Gippsland East and Gippsland West and reduced the size of Gippsland South (renaming it from South Gippsland) and Gippsland North.

It has never been won by the Labor Party, and has been in the hands of the National Party for all but two terms since 1929.

Sir Herbert Hyland held the seat for thirty years from 1929 until he died in office in 1970. He held many portfolios in government including Transport, Chief Secretary, State Development, Labour, Decentralisation and Transport and Prices. Hyland was knighted in 1952,[6] and elected leader of the parliamentary Country Party in 1955.

The district is currently held by Nationals MP Danny O'Brien, who won the seat in a by-election in 2015 following the resignation of former Nationals leader Peter Ryan.

 = now known as Merriman Creek

Members for Gippsland South

Election results

Historical maps

External links
 Electorate profile: Gippsland South District, Victorian Electoral Commission

References

Electoral districts of Victoria (Australia)
Shire of South Gippsland
1859 establishments in Australia
Shire of Wellington